Waggonwaybreen is a glacier in Albert I Land at Spitsbergen, Svalbard. It has a length of about seven kilometers, and debouches into Magdalenefjorden.

The glacier has retreated substantially since 1900.

References 

Glaciers of Spitsbergen